BMS-955176 is an experimental second generation HIV maturation inhibitor under development by Bristol-Myers Squibb for use in the treatment of HIV infection. By blocking the maturation of the virus, it prevents viral reproduction in host CD4+ T cells. First generation maturation inhibitors such as bevirimat were ineffective against some naturally occurring changes (polymorphisms) in the Gag protease polyprotein; BMS-955176 has been selected to better tolerate gag polymorphisms.


Studies 
Results of a phase 2a trial of BMS-955176 was reported at the 2015 Conference on Retroviruses and Opportunistic Infections (CROI). Investigators concluded that the drug was well tolerated and effective against HIV, including strains with gag polymorphisms. Phase 2b studies are currently ongoing in early 2016. It appears that development of BMS-955176 has been terminated.

See also 
 Fipravirimat

References 

Antiretroviral drugs
Maturation inhibitors
Experimental drugs